Kozlina is a surname. Notable people with the surname include:

Aleksandar Kozlina (1938–2013), Yugoslav footballer
Miladin Kozlina (born 1983), Slovenian handball player